Pseudoperonospora is a genus of water moulds which includes several species known for causing downy mildew infections on plants.

Species include:
 Pseudoperonospora cannabina - causes downy mildew on hemp
 Pseudoperonospora cubensis - causes downy mildew on cucurbits
 Pseudoperonospora humuli - causes downy mildew on hops

References

Water mould genera
Water mould plant pathogens and diseases
Peronosporales